Zameen is the title of several Bollywood films.

Zameen (2003)

An action movie directed by Rohit Shetty, the film is based on the hijacking of Indian Airlines Flight 814 by terrorists.  It stars Ajay Devgan, Abhishek Bachchan, and Bipasha Basu. Ajay Devgan plays the character of a soldier who lives by the code and Abhishek Bachchan is an ACP officer. Ram Awana played the role of Akku (one of the four terrorists that hijack the flight).                                           
 .

Zameen (1987)

This film was directed by Ramesh Sippy and starring Sridevi, Sanjay Dutt, Madhuri Dixit, Rajnikanth and Vinod Khanna. The film was shelved halfway through production when the producers ran out of funds and had to shelve the entire project.

Zameen (1943)
This version is a black and white film directed by Anand Kumar and starring Durga Khote

See also
Other Bollywood films about "Zameen":
 Do Bigha Zameen (1953)
 Do Gaz Zameen Ke Neeche (1972)
 Jatt Te Zameen (1987)
 Mazi Zameen (1953)
 Muthi Bhar Zameen (1996 film)
 Parai Zameen (1958 film)
 Zakhmi Zameen (1990)
 Zameen Aasmaan (1946)
 Zameen Aasmaan (1972)
 Zameen Aasmaan (1984)
 Zameen Aasmaan (1995), TV Series by Tanuja Chandra
 Zameen Ka Chand (1937)
Zameen Ka Chand (1961 film)
 Zameen Ke Tare (1960)

External links
 India Times Page

Unreleased Hindi-language films